Ali Kazimi D. Litt. (born 1961) is an Indo-Canadian filmmaker, media artist and writer.

Early life and education
Born and raised in India, Kazimi attended St. Columba's School and graduated from St. Stephen's College, Delhi University in 1982. He was awarded a scholarship to study film production at York University in Toronto Canada, in 1983 and graduated with BFA (honours) from the Department of Film in 1987.  He joined the Department of Film, as a full-time faculty member in 2006 and served as the Chair of, what is now known as, the Department of Cinema and Media Arts from 2015-16.

Films
Kazimi has created a critically acclaimed body of work dealing with issues of race, immigration, history and social justice. His films have won more than thirty awards and nominations including the Gemini Award, Golden Conch (MIFF 2006), Gold Plaque (Chicago International Film Festival, 1995), Golden Gate Award, (San Francisco International Film Festival, 1995) and Best Director Award (Hot Docs Canadian International Documentary Festival, 1995).

Honors
Kazimi was named the Best Documentarian in Toronto by NOW Magazine's Best of Toronto 2005.

In 2019, Kazimi was one of 8 recipients of the Governor General's Award in Visual and Media Arts - "Kazimi’s lovingly rendered and profoundly insightful works demonstrate a deep-rooted empathy for his subjects, a singular cinematic eye, and an unflinching commitment to shedding light on difficult truths."  The same year he also received an honorary degree, D. Litt. honoris causa from the University of British Columbia.

Films
 Narmada: A Valley Rises (1994)
 Shooting Indians (1997)
 Some Kind of Arrangement (1998)
 Continuous Journey (2004)
 Runaway Grooms (2005)
 Random Acts of Legacy (2016)

Book
 Undesirables: White Canada and the Komagata Maru - An Illustrated History (2012)

References

External links
Official web site

1961 births
Living people
Canadian cinematographers
Canadian documentary film directors
Canadian Muslims
Film directors from Toronto
Indian emigrants to Canada
Indian Muslims
Delhi University alumni
York University alumni
Academic staff of York University
Governor General's Award in Visual and Media Arts winners
Canadian people of Indian descent
Asian-Canadian filmmakers